"Rella" is a single by Odd Future featuring members Hodgy Beats, Domo Genesis, and Tyler, The Creator, released as the lead single from Odd Future's debut studio album The OF Tape Vol. 2. It was produced by Left Brain. The single was released digitally on February 20, 2012.

Music video
The music video for "Rella" was released on February 20, 2012 on the official Odd Future YouTube channel. The video was directed by Tyler, The Creator, and according to Pitchfork Media's Jordan Sargent the video can be summarized as "Hodgy Beats shoots lasers from his crotch turning girls into cats, while Domo Genesis smacks a black girl in the face, turning her into an Asian, and Tyler as a coke-snorting centaur." It has over 50 million views on YouTube as of March 2020.

Track listing

References

 
 
 

2012 singles
Alternative hip hop songs
2012 songs
Songs written by Tyler, the Creator